Revnostnyy ("Zealous") was a Project 1135M Burevestnik-class ("Petrel") Guard Ship (SKR) or 'Krivak' class frigate that served with the Soviet Navy. Launched on 23 April 1980, the vessel operated as part of the Pacific Fleet as an anti-submarine vessel, with an armament built around the Metel Anti-Ship Complex. Revnostnyy patrolled extensively as far afield as the Arabian Peninsula and Sea of Japan. Taken out of service for an overhaul in 1988, Revnostnyy was instead placed in reserve until 24 July 2003, when the ship was decommissioned and sold to be broken up.

Design and development
Revnostnyy was one of eleven Project 1135M ships launched between 1970 and 1981. Project 1135, the Burevestnik ("Petrel") class, was envisaged by the Soviet Navy as a less expensive complement to the Project 1134A Berkut A (NATO reporting name 'Kresta II') and Project 1134B Berkut B (NATO reporting name 'Kara') classes of ships. Project 1135M was an improvement developed in 1972 with slightly increased displacement and heavier guns compared with the basic 1135. The design, by N. P. Sobolov, combined a powerful missile armament with good seakeeping for a blue water role. The ships initially retained the same BPK designation as the larger vessels but were designated Guard Ship (SKR) from 28 July 1977 to reflect their substantial greater anti-ship capability than the earlier members of the class and the Soviet strategy of creating protected areas for friendly submarines close to the coast.  NATO forces called the vessels 'Krivak II'-class frigates.

Power was provided by two M7K power sets, each consisting of a combination of a  DK59 and a  M62 gas turbine arranged in a COGAG installation and driving one fixed-pitch propeller. The ship’s complement was 194, including 23 officers.

Armament and sensors
Revnostnyy was designed for anti-submarine warfare around four URPK-5 Rastrub missiles (NATO reporting name SS-N-14 'Silex'), backed up by a pair of quadruple launchers for  torpedoes and a pair of RBU-6000  Smerch-2 anti-submarine rocket launchers. The URPK-5 also had anti-ship capabilities. Defence against aircraft was provided by forty 4K33 OSA-M (SA-N-4 'Gecko') surface to air missiles which were launched from two sets of twin-arm ZIF-122 launchers. Two  AK-100 guns were mounted aft in a superfiring arrangement.

The ship had a well-equipped sensor suite, including a single MR-310A Angara-A air/surface search radar, Don navigation radar, the MP-401S Start-S ESM radar system and the Spectrum-F laser warning system. Fire control for the guns was provided by a MR-143 Lev-214 radar. In addition to the PK-16 decoy-dispenser system, which used chaff, the vessel was equipped with an additional eight-tube decoy system aft specially developed for point-defence against missiles.

Construction and career
Laid down by on 27 June 1979 with the yard number 168 at the Yantar Shipyard in Kaliningrad, Revnostnyy was launched on 23 April 1980. The ship was the penultimate of the class built at the yard. The ship was named for a Russian word that can be translated zealous. The vessel was commissioned on 27 December and was initially based at Baltiysk. The Soviet Union was expanding its Asian presence, and expanding the Pacific Fleet with large combat vessels of comparable capability to the European fleets. Therefore, on 21 February 1981, Revnostnyy was allocated to the Pacific Fleet and set off from the Baltic Sea.

Revnostnyy operated in the Indian and Pacific Oceans, patrolling as far as the coast of East Africa and the Arabian Peninsula. The ship visited Mumbai, India, arriving on 15 November 1984 along with the Project 1135 Burevestnik (NATO reporting name 'Krivak I' class) vessel . The pair stayed for four days. Between 25 March and 17 April 1985, Revnostnyy took part in a major exercise off the coast of Hawaii. A major force, which included the Project 1143 Krechyet ('Kiev' class) aircraft cruiser , three Project 1134B Berkut B ('Kara' class) warships, Revnostnyy and others, was deployed to undertake tactical training in the use of carrier-based aircraft. The exercise was followed by a cruise in the Sea of Japan between 29 May and 16 June to develop tactics for aircraft to undertake anti-shipping and anti-submarine patrols. This was particularly noticed by the United States as the sea is a major deployment area for Soviet ballistic missile submarines.

The ship was handed to Dalzavod in Vladivostok in 1988 for a medium overhaul, but never returned to service. Initially put in reserve, Revnostnyy was decommissioned on 24 July 2003 and sold to be broken up.

References

Citations

Bibliography

 
 
 
 
 
 
 
 
 
 

1980 ships
Cold War frigates of the Soviet Union
Krivak-class frigates
Ships built at Yantar Shipyard
Ships built in the Soviet Union